Tourism is an important economic factor for Germany's northernmost state of Schleswig-Holstein.

Thanks to its coasts on the North Sea in the west and Baltic Sea in the east, Schleswig-Holstein has a great variety of beaches and water sports facilities. Due to its geographical location on the way to Scandinavia it is also a transit area for tourists from all over Europe.

Important tourist resorts

Statistics 

In 2002 there were a total of 176,198 guest beds in Schleswig-Holstein, which were used that year by 2,968,406 visitors for 15,429,614 overnight stays. 278,786 der visitors came from abroad, which represents about 8.6% of all overnighting guests. The bathing resorts on the Baltic Sea had somewhat more visitors (720,115) than those on the North Sea (604,548), but on average the North Sea guests stayed longer, so that the total of overnight stays was greater (5,122,549) than on the Baltic Sea. Less important to tourism were the climatic spas (153,538 visitors with 592,705 overnight stays) and health spas (132,337 visitors with 755,153 overnight stays).

The most important destinations for tourists were, in order of the number of overnight stays:

 Sankt Peter-Ording, North Sea: 909,920 overnight stays, 101,607 visitors of whom 408 (0.4%) from abroad, 8,991 guest beds.
 Westerland, Sylt, North Sea: 819,935 overnight stays, 96,120 visitors of whom 271 (0.28%) from abroad, 9,159 guest beds.
 Grömitz, Baltic Sea: 714,188 overnight stays, 96,116 visitors of whom 413 (0.43%) from abroad, 8,305 guest beds.
 Timmendorfer Strand, Baltic Sea: 676,510 overnight stays, 124,761 visitors of whom 2,567 (2.0%) from abroad, 6,771 guest beds.
 Büsum, North Sea: 658,723, 83,295 visitors, of whom 480 (0.57%) from abroad, 6,846 guest beds.
 Wyk auf Föhr, North Sea: 492,041 overnight stays, 46,368 visitors, of whom 325 (0.70%) from abroad, 4,733 guest beds.
 Burg auf Fehmarn, Baltic Sea: 312,115 overnight stays, 47,704 visitors, of whom 1,476 (3.0%) from abroad, 3 364 guest beds.
 Scharbeutz, Baltic Sea: 292,468 overnight stays, 45,314 visitors, of whom 1,366 (2.92%) from abroad, 3,940 guest beds.
 Norddorf, Amrum, North Sea: 276,978 overnight stays, 25,098 visitors, of whom 576 (2.24%) from abroad, 2,162 guest beds.
 Wenningstedt, Sylt, North Sea: 276,344 overnight stays, 36,775 visitors, of whom 570 (1.53%) from abroad, 2,650 guest beds.

The most important health spa was Malente with 232,000 overnight stays, most important climatic spa was Plön with 132,000 overnight stays.

Regions 

 Angeln
 Bungsberg
 Danish Wahld
 Dithmarschen
 Eiderstedt
 Elbe Marshes
 Mittelholstein with the Aukrug Nature Park and the Westensee Nature Park
 Holstein Switzerland Nature Park, (Schleswig-Holstein Uplands) the heart region of Wagria with the Plöner See
 Hüttener Berge Nature Park
 Lauenburg Lakes Nature Park
 North Frisia
 Probstei
 Sachsenwald, the largest forest in Schleswig-Holstein, owned by the Bismarck family
 Schleswig Geest, large pine forests
 Schwansen
 Wagria

North Sea coast 

 Wadden Sea, Schleswig-Holstein Wadden Sea National Park, mudflat hiking
 Amrum
 Föhr
 Helgoland
 Pellworm
 Sylt
 The Halligen
 North Frisia
 Bay of Husum
 Eiderstedt

Baltic Sea coast 

 Island of Fehmarn
 Eckernförde Bay
 Flensburg Fjord
 Damp
 Grömitz
 Heiligenhafen
 Kiel Fjord
 Baltic Seaside Resort of Laboe
 Lübeck Bay
 Neustadt in Holstein
 Scharbeutz
 Schlei
 Sierksdorf
 Timmendorfer Strand
 Travemünde and the Priwall

Towns 

 Eutin (Castle)
 Flensburg
 Friedrichstadt
 Glücksburg (water castle)
 Husum
 State capital of Kiel
 Hanseatic city of Lübeck (UNESCO World Heritage Site)
 Plön
 Shoemakers' town of Preetz
 Island town of Ratzeburg
 Schleswig (Gottorf Castle)

International events 

 Kiel Week, biggest sailing regatta in the world and biggest summer festival in Northern Europe
 Travemünde Week, the second biggest regatta in the world
 North Sea Week, biggest German regatta for touring sailors on the North Sea off Heligoland
 Robbe & Berking Classic Week, Flensburg Fjord, biggest German regatta series for classic yachts (built before 1969, no yachts built with man-made materials)
 Rum Regatta, biggest gaff rig sailing event in Flensburg
 Lübeck Nordic Film Days
 Schleswig-Holstein Musik Festival, one of the most important music festivals in Europe
 Jazz Baltica, international jazz festival
 Folk Baltica, international folk festival
 Karl May Festival in Bad Segeberg
 Harbour Days (Hafentage) in Husum, biggest maritime town event on the west coast
 Rarities of Piano Music in Husum, internationally renowned piano festival at Husum Castle
 International Puppet Theatre Festival "Pole Poppenspäler Tage" in Husum

Important museums 

 Schleswig-Holstein Open Air Museum in Molfsee near Kiel
 Museumsberg (in Flensburg)
 Kunsthalle Kiel
 Behnhaus (in Lübeck)
 St. Anne's Museum Quarter (in Lübeck)
 Holstentor (in Lübeck)
 Lübeck Museum of Theatre Puppets
 Buddenbrookhaus (in Lübeck)
 Gottorf Castle (in Schleswig)
 Danewerk Museum (near Schleswig)
 Haithabu Viking Museum (near Schleswig)
 Theodor Storm Centre (in Husum)
 Husum North Sea Museum / Nissenhaus (in Husum)
 Husum Castle (in Husum)
 Laboe Naval Memorial and U 995 (in Laboe)

Cycleways and footpaths 

 Old Salt Road between Lübeck and Lüneburg
 Monks Way (Mönchsweg)
 North Sea Cycle Route
 Eider-Treene-Sorge Cycleway
 Baltic Sea Coast Cycleway
 Ox Road (Ochsenweg)
 Viking-Frisian Way

Important leisure facilities 

 The Hansa Park in Sierksdorf on Lübeck Bay
 Ellerhoop-Thiensen Arboretum
 Tolk-Schau Leisure Park

Most beautiful holiday destinations 

A viewers' poll on holiday destinations in the NDR transmission area, that was carried out in 2007 for the NDR television with the title "The most beautiful holiday destinations in North Germany", resulted in the following rankings within Schleswig-Holstein: 
 7: Sylt,
 11: Amrum,
 12: St. Peter Ording,
 13: Holstein Switzerland,
 14: Fehmarn,
 15: Helgoland,
 18: Schleiregion,
 19: Lübeck Bay,
 20: Büsum,
 21: Lübeck,
 22: Hallig Hooge,
 24: Kiel Canal Region,
 27: Kiel,
 31: Flensburg,

(The remaining places were won by other places and regions in the rest of NDR's catchment area.)

External links 

 Holidays in Schleswig-Holstein 
 Reiseziel Schleswig-Holstein (pdf file; 1,84 MB) 
 Youth tourism in Schleswig-Holstein 

Tourist attractions in Schleswig-Holstein
Economy of Schleswig-Holstein
Schleswig-Holstein